The Final Chapter is the sixth and final album by Australian heavy metal band Dungeon. It was released in October 2006 by Modern Invasion Music. The group played its last live performance on 11 December 2005, however singer-guitarist Lord Tim and drummer Tim Yatras announced that they would record a final album under the name Dungeon.  The Australian version also contains re-recorded versions of two very early Dungeon tracks, "Don't Leave Me" and "Changing Moods".

Track listing
*All tracks by Tim Grose and Tim Yatras

Credits

 Lord Tim - vocals, guitar, keyboards, bass
 Tim Yatras - drums, vocals
 Andrew Dowling - bass (guest)
 Mav Stevens - guitar (guest)
 Sabine Linfoot - backing vocals (guest)

2006 albums
Dungeon (band) albums